Santa Inc. is an American stop-motion adult animated Christmas comedy miniseries created by Alexandra Rushfield that premiered on December 2, 2021 on HBO Max.

Premise
The story follows Candy Smalls, a female elf who's currently working as a second-in-command of North Pole, as she goes for her ultimate goal to become a successor as the first female Santa.

Cast and characters 
 Sarah Silverman as Candy Smalls, the highest-ranking female elf and Santa's second in command, who wants to become the next Santa.
 Seth Rogen as Santa Claus, known as Saint Nick (real name Llewellyn Fartini), a jolly, overweight, middle-aged man who distrusts Candy for becoming a successor.
 Leslie Grossman as Cookie, a gingerbread woman and one of Candy's friends.
 Gabourey Sidibe as Goldie, a bisexual reindeer and member of the B-team and is one of Candy's friends.
 Craig Robinson as Junior, the leader of the all-male reindeer A-team and the son of Rudolph the Red-Nosed Reindeer.
 Nicholas Braun as Devin the intern.
 Maria Bamford as Mrs. Leonard Claus and Big Candy.
 Paul Rust as Jeremy/Grandpa Smalls.

Episodes

Production
The stop motion animation is produced by Stoopid Buddy Stoodios, who also created Robot Chicken.

Reception

Santa Inc. received negative reviews from critics.

Daniel D'Addario of Variety wrote that the series' reliance on raunchy humor led to it "feeling dour and heavy, a televised lump of coal". He felt that telling jokes about reindeer being methamphetamine addicts and Mrs Claus being a stripper "doesn’t say anything, really; it just suggests a readiness to provoke". He was more approving of plot elements about a female character seeking to rise in a hostile workplace.

Writing for The Hollywood Reporter, Daniel Fienberg praised the parody of corporate culture, but called the sexual jokes "repetitive and self-satisfied". He also did not find the humor to have good shock value, unlike a recent Christmas special of Big Mouth.

Mira Fox of The Forward gave a negative review, criticizing the massive amount of raunchy humor and Holocaust jokes, poor plot, lazy stereotypes of Jews, and ultimately poor message of the show, saying "You might think that this Christmas series made by two famous Jews would have some greater message about antisemitism or Christianity's hegemony in the U.S. But instead Silverman, too, has reduced Jewishness to a handful of hackneyed stereotypes in "Santa, Inc.""

Joel Keller in an article for Decider wrote that the series is "more raunchy than it is merry", and came close to being "gratuitously dirty", but praised the story and the series' take on gender politics.

Barbara Ellen of The Guardian in a mixed review wrote that the show used "such a relentless bombardment of pointless crudity...the humor is all but flattened", and that ultimately the comedy was "funniest when it's not dirty".

Seth Rogen was subject to criticism when he claimed that the generally negative reception the series received was review bombing by "tens of thousands of white supremacists".

Some viewers also have said that it is similar to Syfy's series "The Pole", another adult animation show about the political power struggle of becoming Santa Claus, the only difference is the rivalry between Santa and his oldest son Jack (calls himself "Black Jack") who only wants to become the new Santa so he could have total control of the North Pole.

Controversy 
According to The Daily Dot, the trailer for the series received backlash in the comments section and over 200,000 dislikes on YouTube, with various antisemitic and Holocaust denial jokes. However, HBO Max defended the trailer and disabled the comments due to its controversies.

See also
 List of Christmas films
 Santa Claus in film

References

External links

HBO Max original programming
2021 American television series debuts
2021 American television series endings
2020s American adult animated television series
American adult animated comedy television series
Television series by Stoopid Buddy Stoodios
Television series by Lionsgate Television
Santa Claus in television
Elves in popular culture
Christmas television series
Animation controversies in television
American stop-motion adult animated television series
Television controversies in the United States